The 12th Canadian Parliament was in session from 15 November 1911 until 6 October 1917. The membership was set by the 1911 federal election on 21 September 1911, and it changed only somewhat due to resignations and by-elections until it was dissolved prior to the 1917 election.  At 5 years, 10 months and 22 days, it was the longest parliament in Canadian history. The parliament was extended beyond the normal limit of five years by the British North America Act, 1916 as a result of World War I.

It was controlled by a Conservative/Liberal-Conservative majority under Prime Minister Sir Robert Borden and the 9th Canadian Ministry.  The Official Opposition was the Liberal Party, led by Wilfrid Laurier. The last year of the wartime parliament was dominated by the Conscription Crisis of 1917. At the end of the parliament, a new ministry, the Union Government, was formed by Borden as a wartime coalition government including Liberals. Laurier refused to join and those Liberals who supported Borden took the name Liberal Unionists. The Union Government went on to win the 1917 federal election.

The Speaker was first Thomas Simpson Sproule, and later Albert Sévigny.  See also List of Canadian electoral districts 1907-1914 for a list of the ridings in this parliament.

There were seven sessions of the 12th Parliament:

List of members

Following is a full list of members of the twelfth Parliament listed first by province, then by electoral district.

Electoral districts denoted by an asterisk (*) indicates that district was represented by two members.

Alberta

British Columbia

Manitoba

New Brunswick

Nova Scotia

Ontario

Prince Edward Island

Quebec

Saskatchewan

Yukon

By-elections

References

Succession

Canadian parliaments
1911 establishments in Canada
1917 disestablishments in Canada
1911 in Canada
1912 in Canada
1913 in Canada
1914 in Canada
1915 in Canada
1916 in Canada
1917 in Canada